JEVS Human Services is a not-for-profit, nonsectarian social service agency based in Philadelphia in the United States. Its aim is to enhance clients' employability and self-sufficiency through a broad range of education, training, health and rehabilitation programs. Its clients come from all backgrounds and walks of life.

The largest multi-service organization of its kind in the region, JEVS Human Services was founded in 1941 as the Jewish Employment and Vocational Service (JEVS). The name was changed to the present one in 2006 as part of a corporate rebranding. The consulting firm hired by JEVS explains the need for a name change on its website as follows: "There was confusion about what the acronym JEVS meant … JEVS has evolved over the years and no longer serves exclusively Jewish people, nor is it solely an organization that offers employment and vocational services."

In addition to the many programs of its own, JEVS Human Services operates the Orleans Technical Institute, which offers training in a variety of occupations.

References

External links
 JEVS Human Services Official website
 

Non-profit organizations based in Pennsylvania
Organizations established in 1941